KU Leuven (or Katholieke Universiteit Leuven) is a Catholic research university in the city of Leuven, Belgium. It conducts teaching, research, and services in computer science, engineering, natural sciences, theology, humanities, medicine, law, canon law, business, and social sciences.

In addition to its main campus in Leuven, it has satellite campuses in Kortrijk, Antwerp, Ghent, Bruges, Ostend, Geel, Diepenbeek, Aalst, Sint-Katelijne-Waver, and in Belgium's capital Brussels. KU Leuven is the largest university in Belgium and the Low Countries. In 2017–18, more than 58,000 students were enrolled. Its primary language of instruction is Dutch, although several programs are taught in English, particularly graduate and postgraduate degrees.

KU Leuven consistently ranks among the top 100 universities in the world by major ranking tables. As of 2021, it ranks 42nd in the Times Higher Education rankings, 70th according QS World University Rankings, 87th according to the Shanghai Academic Ranking of World Universities. For four consecutive years starting in 2016, Thomson Reuters ranked KU Leuven as Europe's most innovative university, with its researchers having filed more patents than any other university in Europe; its patents are also the most cited by external academics.

Although Catholic in theology and heritage, KU Leuven operates independently from the Church. KU Leuven previously only accepted baptized Catholics, but is now open to students from different faiths or life-stances.

While nowadays only the acronymic name KU Leuven is used, the university's legal name is Katholieke Universiteit Leuven, officially Katholieke Universiteit te Leuven, which translates in English as Catholic University of Leuven. However, the acronymic name is not translated in official communications, like its similarly named French-language sister university Université catholique de Louvain (UCLouvain).

History

Previous universities in Leuven 
The city of Leuven has been the seat of three different universities.

The old University of Leuven (or Studium Generale Lovaniense), founded in 1425 by the civil authorities of Brabant duke John IV of Brabant, as well as the municipal administration of the city of Leuven, despite the initial opposition of the chapter of Sint-Pieter, was formally integrated into the French Republic when the Holy Roman Emperor, Francis I, ceded the South Netherlands to France by the Treaty of Campo Formio signed on 17 October 1797. A law dating to 1793, which mandated that all universities in France be closed, came into effect. The old University of Leuven was abolished by decree of the Département of the Dyle on October 25, 1797.

A few years after French rule came to an end, when Belgium was part of the United Kingdom of the Netherlands, king William I of the Netherlands founded in 1817 a secular university in Leuven, the State university of Leuven, where many professors of the old University of Leuven have taught. This university was also abolished in 1835.

Catholic university

The Catholic University of Leuven was founded in 1834 in Mechelen by the bishops of Belgium, after an official Papal Brief of Pope Gregory XVI. This new Catholic university stayed only briefly in Mechelen, as the bishops already moved the university headquarters to Leuven on 1 December 1835, where it took the name Catholic University of Leuven. This occurred after the closure of the State university of Leuven in 1835, where many professors of the old University of Leuven have taught. KU Leuven is generally (but controversially) identified as a continuation of the older institution; controversy lays in the fact that the continuation is mainly of a sociocultural and ecclesiastical nature, but cannot be maintained from a purely juridical perspective as the old University was suppressed under French rule. In its statutes, KU Leuven officially declares to be the continuation of the Studium Generale Lovaniense established in 1425, and together with UCLouvain it sets out to celebrate its 600th anniversary in 2025.

In 1920, the Catholic University of Leuven for the first time admitted female students, lagging some 40 years behind the Belgian universities of Brussels, Liège and Ghent.

Present-day university
In 1968, tensions between the Dutch-speaking and French-speaking communities led to the splitting of the bilingual Catholic University of Leuven into two "sister" universities, with the Dutch-language university becoming a fully functioning independent institution in Leuven in 1970, and the Université catholique de Louvain departing to a newly built greenfield campus site in the French-speaking part of Belgium. KU Leuven's first rector after the split was Pieter De Somer.

In 1972, the KUL set up a separate entity, Leuven Research & Development (LRD), to support industrial and commercial applications of university research. It has led to numerous spin-offs, such as the technology company Metris, and manages tens of millions of euros in investments and venture capital.

The university's electronic learning environment, TOLEDO, which started in September 2001, was gradually developed into the central electronic learning environment at the KUL. The word is an acronym for TOetsen en LEren Doeltreffend Ondersteunen (English: "effectively supporting testing and learning"). It is the collective name for a number of commercial software programs and tools, such as Blackboard. The project offers the Question Mark Perception assignment software to all institution members and has implemented the Ariadne KPS to reuse digital learning objects inside the Blackboard environment.

On 11 July 2002, the KU Leuven became the dominant institution in the "KU Leuven Association" (see below).

KU Leuven is a member of the Coimbra Group (a network of leading European universities) as well as of the LERU Group (League of European Research Universities). Since November 2014, KU Leuven's Faculty of Economics and Business is accredited by European Quality Improvement System, which is a leading accreditation system specializing in higher education institutions of management and business administration. As of academic year of 2012–2013, the university held Erasmus contracts with 434 European establishments. It also had 22 central bilateral agreements in 8 countries: the United States, China, South Africa, Japan, the Democratic Republic of Congo, Vietnam, Poland, and the Netherlands. The vast majority of international EU students came from the Netherlands, while most non-EU ones come from China.

KU Leuven is financially independent from the Catholic Church. Although a representative from the Church sits in its Board of Governors, their function is observational and has no voting power. Its management and academic decisions are similarly autonomous.

In December 2011, the university changed its official name to KU Leuven in all official communications and branding. While its legal name remains to be Katholieke Universiteit Leuven, the university uses its short name or acronym, KU Leuven, in all communications, including academic research publications. The long name is only used in legally binding documents such as contracts and only on the first instance, according to university's communication guidelines. According to its then rector, the change is intended as a way to emphasize its history of freedom of academic inquiry and its independence from the Church, without erasure of its Catholic heritage.

Since August 2017, the university has been led by Luc Sels who replaced former rector Rik Torfs. The Belgian archbishop, André-Joseph Léonard is the current Grand Chancellor and a member of the university board.

KU Leuven hosts the world's largest banana genebank, the Bioversity International Musa Germplasm Transit Centre, that celebrated its 30th anniversary in 2017 and was visited by Deputy Prime Minister and Minister for Development Cooperation, Alexander De Croo.

In 2018, a student of African origin died during a cruel hazing ritual to enter the Reuzegom fraternity. The perpetrators, whose parents mostly belong to the upper class, are being prosecuted, but were so far only lightly sanctioned by the university authorities. As a consequence of these events, which attracted international media coverage, the institution received criticism as to how it handled the matter.

Historically, the Catholic University of Leuven has been a major contributor to the development of Catholic theology. The university is dedicated to Mary, the mother of Jesus, under her traditional attribute as "Seat of Wisdom", and organizes an annual celebration on 2 February in her honour. On that day, the university also awards its honorary doctorates. The neo-Gothic seal created in 1909 and used by the university shows the medieval statue Our Lady of Leuven in a vesica piscis shape. The version used by KU Leuven dates from the 1990s and features the date 1425 in Times New Roman.

Campus

KU Leuven's main campus is in Leuven where school faculties, libraries, institutes, residence halls, the university hospital UZ Leuven, and other facilities are interspersed throughout the city proper, as well as just outside its ring road in Heverlee borough. Its intercultural meeting center Pangaea is located in the city center. The University Sports Centre is located in Heverlee, including Univ-Fit gym. In addition, the UNESCO World Heritage Site Groot Begijnhof, a historic beguinage in the south of city, is owned by the university and functions as one of its many residence halls.

Public transport within the city is primarily served by the De Lijn bus system. Leuven is a main hub in Belgium's and nearby country's train network. Leuven station is located in the northeast edge of the city.

KU Leuven has campuses in Kortrijk, Antwerp, Ghent, Bruges, Ostend, Geel, Diepenbeek, Aalst, Sint-Katelijne-Waver, Brussels.

Organization and academics
Academics at KU Leuven is organized into three groups, each with its own faculties, departments, and schools offering programs up to doctoral level. While most courses are taught in Dutch, many are offered in English, particularly the graduate programs. Notable divisions of the university include the Institute of Philosophy and the Rega Institute for Medical Research.

The students of the university are gathered together in the student's council Studentenraad KU Leuven. They have representatives in most meetings at the university, including the board of directors. LOKO remained the overarching student organisation for all students in the city of Leuven.

Biomedical Sciences Group
 Faculty of Medicine
Faculty of Pharmaceutical Sciences
Faculty of Kinesiology and Rehabilitation Sciences
Department of Cardiovascular Sciences
 Department of Oral Health Sciences
 Department of Pharmaceutical and Pharmacological Sciences
 Department of Human Genetics
 Department of Imaging and Pathology
 Department of Kinesiology
 Department of Microbiology and Immunology
 Department of Cellular and Molecular Medicine
 Department of Neurosciences
 Department of Oncology
 Department of Clinical and Experimental Medicine
 Department of Rehabilitation Sciences
 Department of Development and Regeneration
 Department of Public Health and Primary Care 
Doctoral School of Biomedical Sciences

Humanities and Social Sciences Group
 Institute of Philosophy 
 Faculty of Theology and Religious Studies 
 Faculty of Canon Law 
 Faculty of Law 
 Faculty of Economics and Business 
 Faculty of Social Sciences 
 Faculty of Arts 
 Faculty of Psychology and Educational Sciences 
Documentation and Research Center for Religion, Culture, and Society (KADOC)
Leuven Language Institute
Doctoral School for the Humanities and Social Sciences

Science, Engineering and Technology Group
 Faculty of Architecture
Faculty of Science
Faculty of Engineering Science
Faculty of Bioscience Engineering
Faculty of Engineering Technology
Department of Earth and Environmental Sciences
 Department of Architecture
 Department of Biology
 Department of Biosystems
 Department of Civil Engineering
 Department of Chemistry
 Department of Chemical Engineering
 Department of Computer Science
 Department of Electrical Engineering (ESAT)
 Department of Materials Engineering
 Department of Microbial and Molecular Systems
 Department of Physics and Astronomy
 Department of Mechanical Engineering
 Department of Mathematics
Center for Science, Technology, and Ethics (CWTE)
Arenberg Doctoral School of Science, Engineering, and Technology

Science, Engineering and Technology Group

 European Centre for Ethics
HIVA — Research Institute for Work and Society
Interfaculty Centre for Agrarian History
University Statistics Centre (UCS)
KU Leuven University Energy Institute
LUCAS — Centre for Care Research and Consultancy

Libraries

KU Leuven has 24 libraries and learning centers across its 12 campuses, containing millions of books and other media. Its theology library alone hold 1.3 million volumes, including works dating from the 15th century. The following libraries are found at its Leuven campus:
 2Bergen — Biomedical Library
 2Bergen — Campuslibrary Arenberg (exact sciences, engineering sciences, industrial engineering sciences, bio—engineering sciences, architecture and kinesiology and rehabilitation sciences)
 Artes — Ladeuze & Erasmushuis (Humanities & Social Sciences Group and the Faculty of Arts)
 Library of Psychology and Educational Sciences
 Law Library
 Library of Social Sciences
 Library of the Institute of Philosophy
 AGORA Learning Centre
 EBIB Learning Centre
 MATRIX (music and audio recordings library)
 Maurits Sabbe Library (Library of the Faculty of Theology and Religious Studies)

University hospital
Universitair ziekenhuis Leuven (UZ Leuven) is the teaching hospital associated with the KU Leuven. Its most well known and largest campus is Gasthuisberg, which also houses the faculty of pharmaceutical sciences and most of the faculty of medicine.

Breakthrough and notable research 
KU Leuven scientists have managed to produce a solar hydrogen panel, which is able to directly convert no less than 15 per cent of sunlight into hydrogen gas, which according to them is a world record. In the solar hydrogen panel the hydrogen and oxygen evolution reactions are performed in the gas phase in cathode and anode compartments separated by a membrane. Anion exchange membranes provide an alkaline environment enabling the use of earth abundant materials as electrocatalysts.

According to IEEE Spectrum in 2019 this is a giant leap from 0.1% efficiency 10 years earlier.

This technology bypasses the conversion losses of the classical solar–hydrogen energy cycle where solar power is first harvested via a solar panel and only then to converted to hydrogen with electrolysis plants.

Affiliations
Since July 2002, thirteen higher education institutes have formed the KU Leuven Association. Members include:

 KU Leuven
 LUCA School of Arts
 Odisee
 Thomas More
 UC Leuven Limburg
 Vives

KU Leuven is a member of a number of international university affiliations including the League of European Research Universities, Coimbra Group, UNA Europa, Universitas 21, and  Venice International University, among others.

The university is a member of the Flanders Interuniversity Institute of Biotechnology. The Interuniversity Microelectronics Centre is a spin-off company of the university.

Rankings

As of 2021, KU Leuven ranks in the world 45th in the Times Higher Education rankings, 84th according QS World University Rankings, 97th according to the Shanghai Academic Ranking of World Universities. KU Leuven ranked first in Thomson Reuters' list of Europe's most innovative universities four times in a row since it began in 2016. As of 2019, also ranks 52nd according to the CWTS Leiden Ranking and 56th according U.S. News & World Report Best Colleges Ranking.

According to QS World University Rankings by Subject in 2019, KU Leuven ranked within the world's top 50 universities in the following fields: Sports-related Subjects (11), Theology (14), Dentistry (17), Classics and Ancient History (22), Library and Information Management (23), Psychology (24), Statistics and Operational Research (26), Mechanical Engineering (30), Philosophy (31), Geography (34), Pharmacy & Pharmacology (35), Education and Training (36), Law (37), Social Policy and Administration (39), Development Studies (43), Materials sciences (45), Chemical Engineering (46), Politics (49), Sociology (50), Life Sciences and Medicine (56), Social Sciences and Management (60), Arts and Humanities (61), Engineering and Technology (61). Also according to QS, many other KU Leuven programs rank within the top 100 in the world, including Linguistics, English Language and Literature, History, Anatomy and Physiology, Architecture, Anthropology, Computer Science and Information System, Biological Sciences, Civil and Structural Engineering, Electrical and Electronic Engineering, Business and Management Studies, Mathematics, Economics and Econometrics, Chemistry, Accounting and Finance .

Rectors

Notable alumni

 Leon Bekaert (b. 1958), economics, businessman
 Paul Bulcke (b. 1954), economics, businessman, CEO of Nestlé
 Jan Callewaert, economics, founder of Option N.V.
 Peter Carmeliet, physician and medical scientist
 Mathew Chandrankunnel (b. 1958), professor of philosophy of science at Dharmaram Vidya Kshetram
 Mathias Cormann (b. 1970), Belgian-born Australian senator and Minister for Finance
 Jo Cornu, engineer, previous CEO of the National Railway Company of Belgium
 Joan Daemen (b. 1965), cryptographer, one of the designers of Advanced Encryption Standard (AES). 
 Frans C. De Schryver (b. 1939), chemist
 Julien De Wilde (b. 1967), civil engineer, businessman
 Noël Devisch (b. 1943), agriculture
 Shelton Fabre (b. 1963), American Roman Catholic bishop
 Gabriel Fehervari (b. 1970) law, businessman
 Willy Geysen, law, head of the Centre for Intellectual Property Rights (CIR)
 Suriya Evans-Pritchard Jayanti, American diplomat, U.S. Department of State
 Abdul Qadeer Khan (b. 1936), founder of Pakistan's Nuclear Program 
 Koen Lamberts (b. 1964), President and Vice-Chancellor, University of Sheffield (United Kingdom)
 Koen Lenaerts, law, president of the European Court of Justice
 Georges Meekers (b. 1965), Belgian-born wine writer and educator
 Simon Mignolet (b. 1988), goalkeeper
 Martin Moors, philosopher
 Rudi Pauwels (b. 1960), pharmacologist, co-founder of Tibotec and Virco 
 Vincent Rijmen (b. 1970), cryptographer, one of the designers of Advanced Encryption Standard (AES).
 Guðmundur Steingrímsson (b. 1972), Icelandic politician
 Francine Swiggers, economics, businesswoman
 Wu Rong-i, economics, former Vice Premier of Taiwan, Taiwanese politician
 Andreas Utermann, finance, former CEO of Allianz Global Investors
 Jef Valkeniers, doctor and politician
 Astrid van Oyen, archaeologist and professor
 Marc Van Ranst (b. 1965), physician, virologist
 Herman Van Rompuy (b. 1947), Belgian statesman, appointed President of the European Council in November 2009
 Frans Vanistendael, law
 Catherine Verfaillie (b. 1957) physician, stem cell scientist 
 Koen Vervaeke (b. 1959), history, diplomat

Honorary doctorates

Notable recipients of honorary doctorates at the KU Leuven include:
 Albert II of Belgium (1961), King of the Belgians
 James P. Allison (2017), Immunologist, Nobel Prize in Physiology or Medicine 2018
 Timothy Garton Ash (2011), British historian and Professor of European Studies, University of Oxford
 Michelle Bachelet (2015), President of Chile
 Abhijit Banerjee (2014), Indian economist, Massachusetts Institute of Technology
 Patriarch Bartholomew I of Constantinople (1996)
 Baudouin of Belgium (1951), King of the Belgians
 Roberto Benigni (2007),  Italian actor, comedian, screenwriter and director of film, theatre and television.
 John Braithwaite (2008), Australian criminologist (application of the idea of restorative justice to business regulation and peacebuilding)
 Manuel Castells (2004), Professor of Sociology, Open University of Catalonia, University of Southern California
 Leon O. Chua (2013), professor in the electrical engineering and computer sciences department at the University of California, Berkeley
 Carla Del Ponte (2002), former Chief prosecutor of two United Nations international criminal law tribunals
 Jared Diamond (2008), professor of Geography and Physiology, UCLA
 Jacques Derrida (1989), French philosopher
 John Kenneth Galbraith (1972), Canadian economist
 Nadine Gordimer (1980), South African author, Booker Prize 1974, Nobel Prize in Literature 1991
 Alan Greenspan (1997), economist, former chairman of the Board of Governors of the US Federal Reserve
 Eugène Ionesco (1977), Romanian and French playwright
 Ban Ki-moon (2015), Secretary-General of the United Nations
 Helmut Kohl (1996), former Chancellor of Germany
 Christine Lagarde (2012), Managing Director of the International Monetary Fund (IMF)
 Mario Vargas Llosa (2003), Peruvian writer
 Angela Merkel (2017), German politician, Chancellor of Germany
 Michael Marmot (2014), British epidemiologist, University College London
 Martha Nussbaum (1997), American philosopher, University of Chicago
 Dirk Obbink, Lecturer in Papyrology and Greek Literature at Oxford University and the head of the Oxyrhynchus Papyri Project.
 Roger Penrose (2005), professor in Mathematical Physics, University of Oxford
 Navi Pillay (2012), United Nations High Commissioner for Human Rights
 Thomas S. Popkewitz (2004), professor of curriculum theory, University of Wisconsin-Madison School of Education
 Mary Robinson (2000), former President of Ireland
 Jacques Rogge (2012), President of the International Olympic Committee (IOC)
 Oscar Arnulfo Romero (1980), archbishop of San Salvador (El Salvador), human rights activist
 Helmut Schmidt (1983), former Chancellor of Germany
 Nate Silver (2013), American author and statistician
 Fiona Stanley (2014),  Australian epidemiologist
 Rowan Williams (2011), Archbishop of Canterbury

Bibliography
 1860 : Souvenir du XXVe anniversaire de la fondation de l'Université catholique: Novembre 1859, Louvain, typographie Vanlinthout et Cie, 1860 Souvenir du XXVe anniversaire de la fondation de l'Université catholique: Novembre 1859.

See also

 Academic libraries in Leuven
 Arenberg Research-Park
 Haasrode Research-Park
 Interdisciplinary Centre for Law and ICT
 Science and technology in Flanders
 University Foundation
 List of oldest universities in continuous operation
 List of split up universities
 List of universities in Belgium

Footnotes
A. According to the university's style guidelines, KU Leuven is the university's name in all languages. However, according to the university's statutes, the university's legal name by the law of 28 May 1970 issuing legal personality to the institution is Katholieke Universiteit te Leuven, which is used in the university's own official publications, with a variant Katholieke Universiteit Leuven according to the Flemish Community of Belgium.
C. The Old University of Leuven (1425–1797) is the oldest university in the low countries, and the Catholic University of Leuven (1834) is generally, yet controversially, identified as a continuation of it. In the mid-1800s, Belgium's highest court, the Court of Cassation, ruled that the 1834 "Catholic University of Leuven" was a different institution created under a different charter and thus cannot be regarded as continuing the 1425 "University of Leuven". See also: History of the Old University of Leuven.

References

External links
 
 
  KU Leuven: History of KU Leuven / KU Leuven, zes eeuwen geschiedenis
 International Ranking of Katholieke Universiteit Leuven (2008)

 
Catholic University of Leuven
Buildings and structures in Leuven
Education in Leuven
Catholic universities and colleges in Belgium
Pontifical universities
1970 establishments in Belgium
Educational institutions established in 1834

id:Universitas Katolik Leuven